Mount Brennan is a dome-shaped mountain,  high, which is the northernmost prominent summit in the Hughes Range, standing  northeast of Mount Cartwright. It was discovered and photographed by the United States Antarctic Service on Flight C of February 29–March 1, 1940, and surveyed by A.P. Crary in 1957–58. It was named by Crary for Matthew J. Brennan, scientific station leader at Ellsworth Station, 1958.

References 

Mountains of the Ross Dependency
Dufek Coast